Liver carboxylesterase 1 also known as carboxylesterase 1 (CES1, hCE-1 or CES1A1) is an enzyme that in humans is encoded by the CES1 gene. The protein is also historically known as serine esterase 1 (SES1), monocyte esterase and cholesterol ester hydrolase (CEH).  Three transcript variants encoding three different isoforms have been found for this gene.  The various protein products from isoform a, b and c range in size from 568, 567 and 566 amino acids long, respectively.

CES1 is present in most tissues with higher levels in the liver and low levels in the gastrointestinal tract.

Function

Carboxylesterase 1 is a serine esterase and member of a large multigene carboxylesterase family. It is also part of the alpha/beta fold hydrolase family.  These enzymes are responsible for the hydrolysis of ester- and amide-bond-containing xenobiotics and drugs such as cocaine and heroin. They also hydrolyze long-chain fatty acid esters and thioesters. As part of phase II metabolism, the resulting carboxylates are then often conjugated by other enzymes to increase solubility and eventually excreted.

This enzyme is known to hydrolyze aromatic and aliphatic esters and can manage cellular cholesterol esterification levels. It may also play a role in detoxification in the lung and/or protection of the central nervous system from ester or amide compounds.

The protein contains an amino acid sequence at its N-terminus that sends it into the endoplasmic reticulum where a C-terminal sequence can bind to a KDEL receptor.

Clinical significance 

Carboxylesterase 1 deficiency may be associated with non-Hodgkin lymphoma or B-cell lymphocytic leukemia.  Inhibition of CES1 by in particular organophosphates reduces tumor-killing activity by monocytes.  The loss of this protein in monocytes is one product of organophosphate poisoning.

CES1 can activate or deactivate various drugs.  CES1 is responsible for the activation of many prodrugs such as angiotensin-converting enzyme (ACE) inhibitors, oseltamivir, and dabigatran. Genetic variants of CES1 can significantly affect both pharmacokinetics and pharmacodynamics of drugs metabolized by CES1, such as methylphenidate and clopidogrel.  The ability of CES1 to metabolize heroin and cocaine among other drugs has suggested a therapeutic role for the enzyme.

Interactive pathway map

References

Further reading

Genes on human chromosome 16